The MAB PA-15 (Pistolet Automatique 15, also known as the P-15 or P.15 Standard) was a French semi-automatic pistol, designed by the Manufacture d'armes de Bayonne. The model number, 15, refers to the magazine capacity. The PA-15 was introduced in 1966 along with a short-lived 8-round version with a single stack magazine, the P-8.

Use
The PA-15 was designed for commercial sale, primarily for export as French laws severely restricted the possession of "military-caliber" arms (which included the ubiquitous 9mm).  The pistols were proofed at the St Etienne proof house and many were exported to the US.  Early pistols are blued, later ones Parkerized.  There was a competition version called the P-15 F1.  This version had a longer slide and barrel (150mm), and an adjustable rear sight.  While the French armed forces did not adopt the PA-15, the Army, Air Force (Armée de l'Air) and the Gendarmerie bought limited quantities of the competition model under the designation Pistolet Automatique de Précision (PAP) Modèle F1.  When the French Gendarmerie was looking for a double-action pistol with a high magazine capacity to replace their aging PA 1950s, MAB produced an experimental model of the PA-15 with double-action lockwork.  However, the Gendarmerie instead procured a license to manufacture the Beretta 92F as the MAS G-1, and the double-action PA-15 was not commercially produced.  Outside France, in the 1970s the Finnish military and some police forces adopted the PA-15.

When the Manufacture d'armes de Bayonne closed in 1982, all remaining PA-15 parts were sold to a French company, Lechkine Armory (Armurerie Chevasson), which as of 2009 still assembled and sold new PA-15s, and is the sole source for new PA-15 parts.

Functioning

MAB PA-15 is a delayed blowback operated, semi-automatic pistol. It featured Savage-type, rotating, but not reciprocating, barrel, which has two lugs: one under the chambers is engaged in the frame and allows to the barrel to rotate but not to move back or forward. The other lug (camming lug) is situated on the upper surface of the barrel: it is engaged in an L-shaped cam track in the slide. When the pistol is fired, the rotational inertia of the barrel, the bullet torque and the slide's linear inertia (leveraged through the cam track) all act against the opening force of the cartridge. When the bullet leaves the barrel, internal pressures have dropped and so the action is safe to open: the slide rotates the barrel completely, moves backward, ejects the spent casing and moves forward to pick up a new cartridge, cycling the action. MAB PA-15 has a frame mounted safety, on the left side of the frame, and also internal magazine safety, which does not allow the gun to be fired with magazine removed.

Variants 
A long-barreled version, known as the PA-15 Target, was used by the French military as the PAP F-1. 7,65 Parabellum for Italian market.

Users 
: Central African Republic Police

: French Army (evaluation only)

 : People's Movement for the Liberation of Azawad

See also 
 GIAT BM92-G1 (PAMAS-G1)

References 
 Jean Huon.  Les Pistolets Automatiques Français, 1890–1990.  Paris: Histoire & Collections, 1995.  .
 Bernard Meyer. "Les Prototypes MAB".  Gazette des Armes, #200.

External links 
 https://web.archive.org/web/20070228220950/http://world.guns.ru/handguns/hg89-e.htm
 http://www.gunsworld.com/french/mabp15_us.html
 http://www.securityarms.com/20010315/galleryfiles/2800/2895.htm

9mm Parabellum semi-automatic pistols
Semi-automatic pistols of France